SAFM 96.1 (ACMA callsign: 5SEF) is an Australian commercial radio station based in Mount Gambier, South Australia, owned by Southern Cross Austereo. It commenced broadcasting on 16 May 1998 under the name FM 96.1.

The first breakfast host was Lyndon Smith who later moved to sister station 963 5SE (now Triple M Limestone Coast). The station changed its name to 96.1 Star FM in early 1999.

On 14 December 2016, Southern Cross Austero rebranded Star FM, as all of their regional Hit Network affiliated stations changed to one centralised "Hit" brand. On 27 July 2020, the station was rebranded as SAFM, alongside its sister station in Adelaide formerly known as Hit107.

Programming is broadcast from Adelaide, Albury, Gold Coast and Townsville.

References

External links
  Hit96.1 Limestone Coast

Radio stations in South Australia